"Inspiration on Demand" is the second single from Shadows Fall's album The War Within. The song charted at no. 33 on the Hot Mainstream Rock Tracks chart, making it the band's most successful single to date.

Track listing

Music video
The video opens up with the band performing the song on top of a cliff in a canyon. Vocalist Brian Fair suddenly wakes up on a bed in the middle of a street, with a bus coming straight for him. Before the bus hits him, he suddenly transports inside of the bus. Fair exits the bus and begins wandering the streets of the city. Fair then appears in an elevator before he begins levitating. The video ends with the band members walking around the city with Fair being saved from the same bus in the beginning of the video.

Personnel
Brian Fair – lead vocals
Jon Donais – lead guitar
Matt Bachand – rhythm guitar, additional clean vocals
Paul Romanko – bass
Jason Bittner – drums

References

2004 songs
2005 singles
Shadows Fall songs
Century Media Records singles